Pierre Alexandre Joseph Allent (1772–1837) was a French général de division (major general). He served in the Chamber of Deputies under the Bourbon Restoration and in the Chamber of Peers under the July Monarchy. He was a knight of the Order of Saint Louis and a commander of the Legion of Honour.

References

1772 births
1837 deaths
Members of the Chamber of Peers of the July Monarchy
Members of the Chamber of Deputies of the Bourbon Restoration
Knights of the Order of Saint Louis
Commandeurs of the Légion d'honneur
Place of birth missing